Stephanie Pohl (born 7 May 1978 in Finsterwalde, Bezirk Cottbus) is a female beach volleyball player from Germany, who won the gold medal at the 2003 European Championships in Alanya, partnering Okka Rau. She represented her native country at the 2004 Summer Olympics in Athens and the 2008 Summer Olympics in Beijing.

Playing partners 
 Okka Rau
 Ines Pianka
 Martina Stoof

References

External links 
 
 
 
 Beijing 2008 Olympics Profile

1978 births
Living people
People from Finsterwalde
People from Bezirk Cottbus
German women's beach volleyball players
Sportspeople from Brandenburg
Olympic beach volleyball players of Germany
Beach volleyball players at the 2004 Summer Olympics
Beach volleyball players at the 2008 Summer Olympics
20th-century German women